The Bucktail Path is a  linear hiking trail in north-central Pennsylvania, United States, through portions of Elk State Forest. Most of the trail is in Cameron County, with its northern end in Potter County. It should not be confused with the scenic highway in the same region known as Bucktail Trail; several features in the region were named after the Bucktail Regiment of local soldiers during the American Civil War. 

The Bucktail Path is often described as one of the most isolated and least hiked backpacking trails in Pennsylvania, with a path that can be difficult to follow even for experienced hikers; and it has experienced long periods of under-use with little maintenance. It is also known for several challenging climbs and bridgeless stream crossings.

Route
This description illustrates the Bucktail Path in the southbound direction. The trail begins at a parking lot on East Cowley Road just to the east of Sizerville State Park along the western edge of Potter County. The trail quickly climbs to the top of the Allegheny Plateau. After a partial descent, the trail walks along Crooked Run Road briefly then climbs to the top of the plateau again, utilizing a system of lengthy switchbacks remaining from old logging railroad grades. 

The Bucktail Path enters Cameron County at 9.1 miles. It begins a lengthy walk alongside McNuff Branch at 9.7 miles, with several bridgeless crossings of that stream and its incoming tributaries for about the next four miles. The high valley formed by McNuff Branch has been noted for its scenery and isolation, with little evidence of human civilization but much evidence of centuries of beaver activity. At 13.7 miles, the trail crosses Hunts Run Road, climbs to the top of the plateau again then descends steeply to a crossing of Whitehead Road at 18.5 miles. This is followed by yet another steep climb to the top of the plateau, after which the trail stays on high ground until near its southern end. 

The trail reaches Brooks Run Fire Tower at 23.9 miles; the tower is still used by forestry officials to spot fires, but it is fenced off to the public. At 25.8 miles, reach a junction with a trail that heads into Square Timber Wild Area. Starting at 26.8 miles, the Bucktail Path follows a wide pipeline swath for more than two miles. After leaving the pipeline, the trail continues southbound along the top of a narrow ridgeline with vistas over canyons to both the west and the east; those canyons are the routes of two upper branches of Sinnemahoning Creek. In this area, the trail traverses portions of Johnson Run Natural Area and a large parcel of private land. At 31.3 miles, the Bucktail Path joins a gravel road and descends off the plateau very steeply. At the bottom, the hiker must cross Grove Run without a bridge; the Bucktail Path then ends after 33.5 miles at Grove Street, just outside the village of Sinnemahoning. From the southern terminus, the hiker could follow local roads for less than two miles to reach both the Donut Hole Trail and the Old Sinnemahoning Trail, which leads to the Quehanna Trail.

References

Hiking trails in Pennsylvania
Long-distance trails in the United States